The Trade Unions' Equestrian Complex (now Equestrian Complex «Bitsa» ) is an equestrian venue located near the Bitsa Park in the South District of Moscow city, Russia. During the 1980 Summer Olympics, it hosted the riding and running portions of the modern pentathlon events and all of the equestrian events except individual jumping.

References
1980 Summer Olympics official report. Volume 2. Part 1. pp. 104–10.

Venues of the 1980 Summer Olympics
Sports venues in Moscow
Olympic equestrian venues
Olympic modern pentathlon venues